Twelve ships of the Royal Navy have borne the name HMS Elizabeth.  Most of these ships have been named in honour of Queen Elizabeth I of England:
 , also known as Great Elizabeth, was a ship purchased in 1514 and wrecked later that year. She had previously been the merchant Salvator.
  was a large 56-gun galleon launched in 1559. She was rebuilt in 1597-98. She was sold in 1618.
  was a 16-gun vessel in service between 1577 and 1588.
  was a 38-gun frigate launched in 1647. She served during the Second Anglo-Dutch War but was burnt by the Dutch in 1667.
  was a hoy purchased by the Royalists in 1648. She deserted to the Parliamentarians in 1649 and was sold in 1653.
  was a third-rate ship of the line launched in 1679. She was rebuilt in 1704, but captured by the French later that year.
  was a 70-gun third rate launched in 1706. She was rebuilt to carry 64 guns in 1737 and was broken up by 1766.
  was a 74-gun third-rate ship of the line launched in 1769. She served in the American War of Independence and the French Revolutionary War, and was broken up in 1797.
  was a 3-gun gunvessel purchased in 1795 and in service until at least 1801.
  was a 10-gun cutter captured from the Spanish in 1805. She foundered in 1807.
  was a 14-gun schooner that  captured from the French in 1805. Around 1812 the Navy enlarged and converted her to brig. Elizabeth capsized in 1814.
  was a 74-gun third-rate ship of the line launched in 1807. She served in the Napoleonic Wars and was broken up in 1820.
 Elizabeth, cutter; 7 January 1812 whilst cruising off Plymouth discovered Deux Freres, from Lorient, which  had recently captured, and brought Deux Freres into port.

See also

References
 

Royal Navy ship names